Jamieson Robert Forrest Bennett (commonly known as Jamie Bennett) is a business entrepreneur from Aberdeen, Scotland. He is currently chairman and CEO of OPEX Group.

Bennett was born in December 1971 and grew up in Aberdeenshire where he attended Turriff Academy before going onto study engineering at the University of Aberdeen, graduating with a Bachelor of Engineering (honours).

Career 
In 1995, Bennett started his first company, Atlas Interactive Limited, an oil and gas technology business that developed e-learning software. Bennett sold Atlas in 2007 and left the business in 2009.

In 2010, Bennett founded Enerco Venture, an investment company focused on the gas and oil industry. One of Enerco's first investments was Operational Excellence (OPEX) Group Ltd. In 2011, Enerco invested in Mintra and together the companies formed Mintra Training Portal, a provider of competency services for the oil and gas industry. In 2013, Enerco Group invested £3 million in the redevelopment of an office complex in the west end of Aberdeen.

Bennett is currently chairman and CEO of OPEX Group. OPEX provides data analytics to oil and gas companies.

Bennett was inaugural winner of the Elevator 'Inspirational Mentor of the Year' award in 2018, recognizing his support of aspiring business owners.

References

External links
Atlas Interactive homepage
Enerco Group homepage
Operational Excellence homepage
Mintra Training Portal homepage
Elevator Awards Homepage 
RGU News: Streetsport received Enerco Support 

Scottish businesspeople
People from Aberdeen
Living people
Year of birth missing (living people)
People educated at Turriff Academy
Alumni of the University of Aberdeen